Peter Curran may refer to:

Peter Curran (director) (1924–1999), British film director and producer
Peter Curran (footballer) (born 1962), Australian rules footballer
Peter Curran (presenter), British radio producer, writer, documentary maker, broadcaster and publisher
Peter Curran (astronomer) (1977–2016), Irish astronomer
Pete Curran (1860–1910), British Member of Parliament for Jarrow, 1907–1910

See also
John Curran (baseball) (1852–1896), baseball player, incorrectly listed as Peter Curren